Laulu yhteisestä leivästä is a 1984 album by Finnish gospel musician Jaakko Löytty. The album was commissioned by the Finnish Missionary Society for its 125th anniversary, which was celebrated in Helsinki in June 1984. The album is dedicated to the life work of Leonard Auala, first bishop of the ELCIN church in Namibia.

The guest vocalists on the album and the project include Taru Hallama, Jukka Leppilampi and Outi Terho.

The record was released by Kirjapaja on it label just records, together with the Finnish Missionary Society.

Track listing
All words and music by Jaakko Löytty; arrangements by the band, additional arrangements by Jaakko Löytty (vocals) and Jouko Laivuori (wind instruments).
Lead vocals by Jaakko Löytty, except as indicated: A3, B6, B9.

Side one

Side two

Musicians
Jaakko Löytty — vocals, acoustic guitar
Taru Hallama — vocals
Jukka Leppilampi — vocals
Outi Terho — vocals
Jouko Laivuori — keyboards
Mikko Löytty — bass
Sakari Löytty — drums, percussion
Pekka Ruuska — guitar

Guests
Simo Salminen — trumpet, solo (A4)
Tapani Rinne — soprano saxophone, tenor saxophone
Markku Veijonsuo — trombone, bass tuba, solo (B5)

Production
Pekka Ruuska — producer, mixing
Juha Heininen — recording engineer, mixing
Tapsa Rantanen — kansi
Hannu Bask — cover photo
Pirjo Esko, Kari Kuitunen — photos of the vocalist

External links
Laulu yhteisestä leivästä in Discogs

Jaakko Löytty albums
1984 albums